Gunn Vigdis Olsen-Hagen (born 14 August 1946 in Sandnes, died 30 December 1989) was a Norwegian politician for the Labour Party.

She was elected to the Norwegian Parliament from Rogaland in 1977, and was re-elected on three occasions. A few months into her fourth term she died and was replaced by Kari Helliesen.

On the local level she was a member of Sandnes city council from 1971 to 1979.

Outside politics she spent her career in the administrative department of Rogalands Avis.

References

1946 births
1989 deaths
Members of the Storting
Rogaland politicians
Labour Party (Norway) politicians
People from Sandnes
Women members of the Storting
20th-century Norwegian women politicians
20th-century Norwegian politicians